"The Only Difference Between Martyrdom and Suicide Is Press Coverage" (often shortened to "The Only Difference...") is the debut single and second track from American rock band Panic! at the Disco's debut studio album A Fever You Can't Sweat Out (2005). It achieved some commercial success and exposed the band to an audience, subsequently reaching number 77 on the US Billboard Hot 100. No music video was ever made for it.

Like several of Panic! at the Disco's song titles on A Fever You Can't Sweat Out, the title of this track is paraphrased from the novel Survivor by Chuck Palahniuk.

Remix
The Tommie Sunshine Brooklyn Fire Remix of the song is featured in the film Snakes on a Plane. It is also featured as the B-side to the group's next single "I Write Sins Not Tragedies".

Track listing

Charts

Certifications

References

2005 songs
2005 debut singles
Panic! at the Disco songs
Fueled by Ramen singles
Songs written by Ryan Ross
Songs written by Spencer Smith (musician)
Songs written by Brendon Urie
Songs about suicide